Cristian Gabriel Rodríguez Barotti (born 30 September 1985) is a Uruguayan former footballer who played as a left winger.

Having received the nickname Cebolla (onion) from his Peñarol days, from his father, he was well known for his speed and technical ability. He spent several seasons in Portugal with Benfica and Porto, and also competed professionally in France, Spain, Italy, Brazil and Argentina.

Rodríguez earned 110 caps for Uruguay, representing the country in two World Cups and four Copa América tournaments and winning the 2011 edition of the latter.

Club career

Peñarol and PSG

Born in Juan Lacaze, Rodríguez started playing professionally, still a youngster, for local Peñarol in the Uruguayan Primera División, where he helped the side to the 2003 title. After an injury ruled him out for some games in late 2004, he was spotted by television cameras jumping in the stands alongside the supporters, but he eventually escaped a fine or suspension.

In 2005, Rodríguez was transferred to French club Paris Saint-Germain F.C. on a free transfer, along with Carlos Bueno. After appearing scarcely in his first season in Ligue 1, he was important in helping the capital team barely avoid relegation, scoring his only goal in a 4–2 home win against AS Monaco FC.

Porto
In late August 2007, Rodríguez moved to Portugal's S.L. Benfica in a season-long loan, together with compatriot Maxi Pereira who arrived from Defensor Sporting. After being one of their most important players through 2007–08, he was bought by fellow Primeira Liga club FC Porto in June 2008 (but part of the transfer fee was paid to Play International B.V.). During the two teams' match in Lisbon, on 30 August 2008, he was subjected to vitriolic abuse from the stands in a 1–1 final draw. He eventually settled nonetheless, forming an attacking trio with Argentine Lisandro López and Brazilian Hulk and also scoring occasionally through unsuspecting headers.

After Silvestre Varela was bought by Porto in the 2009 off-season, Rodríguez was relegated to a substitute role. He still made 32 competitive appearances in the 2010–11 campaign (two goals, including one in 11 matches in a victorious run in the UEFA Europa League).

On 17 February 2014, Rodríguez was condemned to pay a €45,000 fine for assaulting two stewards at the Estádio da Luz, following a tunnel brawl during the 0–1 away league loss against Benfica on 20 December 2009.

Atlético Madrid

On 28 May 2012, Rodríguez signed a four-year contract with Atlético Madrid after being released by Porto. He scored his first two goals for his new team in the Europa League group stage, against Hapoel Tel Aviv FC (3–0 away victory) and FC Viktoria Plzeň (home); in the latter, he netted the game's only goal through a thunderous left-foot shot in the 93rd minute.

On 20 January 2015, Rodríguez joined Parma F.C. until the end of the season. Less than two months later, however, due to the Italian club's precarious financial situation, he joined Brazil's Grêmio Foot-Ball Porto Alegrense also on loan.

Rodríguez left Grêmio on 8 May 2015, after struggling with injuries and totalling less than 80 minutes of action.

Independiente
On 24 July 2015, Rodríguez agreed to a two-year deal at Club Atlético Independiente as a free agent. After suffering from several injury problems, his contract was terminated on 19 December 2016.

Return to Uruguay
On 3 February 2017, Rodríguez announced his return to Peñarol. He went on to win the 2017 and 2018 national championships as well as the 2018 Supercopa Uruguaya, ending his second stint in April 2021 with 126 appearances and 39 goals in all competitions.

Rodríguez joined Club Plaza Colonia de Deportes on 20 April 2021. On 17 January 2023, he announced his retirement at the age of 37.

International career

Rodríguez made his Uruguay national team debut at age 18 in a friendly against Mexico, and represented the nation in two Copa América tournaments, scoring in the 2007 edition in a 4–1 quarter-final win over Venezuela, the hosts. After assaulting Argentina's Gabriel Heinze during the 2010 FIFA World Cup qualifying stage (0–1 home loss) he received a four-match ban, and coach Oscar Tabárez opted to not select him for the final stages in South Africa.

Rodríguez was included in the 2015 Copa América squad, scoring the only goal in the tournament opener against Jamaica in Antofagasta. The 32-year-old was also selected for the 2018 World Cup.

Career statistics

Club

International

Uruguay score listed first, score column indicates score after each Rodríguez goal.

Honours

Peñarol
Uruguayan Primera División: 2003, 2017, 2018
Supercopa Uruguaya: 2018

Paris Saint-Germain
Coupe de France: 2005–06

Porto
Primeira Liga: 2008–09, 2010–11, 2011–12
Taça de Portugal: 2008–09, 2009–10, 2010–11
Supertaça Cândido de Oliveira: 2010
UEFA Europa League: 2010–11
UEFA Super Cup runner-up: 2011

Atlético Madrid
La Liga: 2013–14
Copa del Rey: 2012–13
Supercopa de España: 2014; Runner-up 2013
UEFA Super Cup: 2012

Uruguay
Copa América: 2011

See also
List of footballers with 100 or more caps

References

External links

1985 births
Living people
People from Juan Lacaze
Uruguayan people of Spanish descent
Uruguayan sportspeople of Italian descent
Uruguayan footballers
Association football wingers
Uruguayan Primera División players
Peñarol players
Club Plaza Colonia de Deportes players
Ligue 1 players
Paris Saint-Germain F.C. players
Primeira Liga players
S.L. Benfica footballers
FC Porto players
La Liga players
Atlético Madrid footballers
Serie A players
Parma Calcio 1913 players
Campeonato Brasileiro Série A players
Grêmio Foot-Ball Porto Alegrense players
Argentine Primera División players
Club Atlético Independiente footballers
Uruguay youth international footballers
Uruguay under-20 international footballers
Uruguay international footballers
2004 Copa América players
2007 Copa América players
2011 Copa América players
2013 FIFA Confederations Cup players
2014 FIFA World Cup players
2015 Copa América players
2018 FIFA World Cup players
Copa América-winning players
FIFA Century Club
Uruguayan expatriate footballers
Expatriate footballers in France
Expatriate footballers in Portugal
Expatriate footballers in Spain
Expatriate footballers in Italy
Expatriate footballers in Brazil
Expatriate footballers in Argentina
Uruguayan expatriate sportspeople in France
Uruguayan expatriate sportspeople in Portugal
Uruguayan expatriate sportspeople in Spain
Uruguayan expatriate sportspeople in Italy
Uruguayan expatriate sportspeople in Brazil
Uruguayan expatriate sportspeople in Argentina